Carlton Francis Willey (June 6, 1931 – July 20, 2009) was an American professional baseball player who pitched eight seasons for the Milwaukee Braves and New York Mets of Major League Baseball. Willey missed the first three months of the 1964 season after having his jaw broken by a line drive hit by Gates Brown during a spring training game.

After his playing career ended, Carlton Willey served as a scout for the Philadelphia Phillies.

Willey died of lung cancer on July 20, 2009, in Ellsworth, Maine.

References

External links

1931 births
2009 deaths
American Association (1902–1997) MVP Award winners
Atlanta Crackers players
Baseball players from Maine
Buffalo Bisons (minor league) players
Deaths from cancer in Maine
Deaths from lung cancer
Major League Baseball pitchers
Milwaukee Braves players
New York Mets players
People from Washington County, Maine
Philadelphia Phillies scouts
Quebec Braves players
Toledo Sox players
Wichita Braves players